Baker Bridge, also known as Huntingdon County Bridge No. 14, is a historic reinforced concrete closed spandrel arch bridge spanning the Great Trough Creek and located at Todd Township, Huntingdon County, Pennsylvania.  It was built in 1917, and measures  and has a  bridge deck.  It has two arch spans.

It was added to the National Register of Historic Places in 1990.

References

Road bridges on the National Register of Historic Places in Pennsylvania
Bridges completed in 1917
Bridges in Huntingdon County, Pennsylvania
National Register of Historic Places in Huntingdon County, Pennsylvania
Concrete bridges in the United States
Arch bridges in the United States